Gmina Łomazy is a rural gmina (administrative district) in Biała Podlaska County, Lublin Voivodeship, in eastern Poland.

Villages
Gmina Łomazy contains the villages and tatar settlements from 1679 of Bielany, Burwin, Dubów, Huszcza Druga, Huszcza Pierwsza, Jusaki-Zarzeka, Kopytnik, Korczówka, Koszoły, Kozły, Krasówka, Łomazy, Lubenka, Stasiówka, Studzianka, Szymanowo, Wola Dubowska and Wólka Korczowska.

Neighbouring gminas
Gmina Łomazy is bordered by the gminas of Biała Podlaska, Drelów, Komarówka Podlaska, Piszczac, Rossosz, Sosnówka, Tuczna and Wisznice.

References

External links
Polish official population figures 2006

Lomazy
Biała Podlaska County